Tân Lập may refer to:

Tân Lập, Bac Kan, Vietnam
Tân Lập, Bac Giang, Vietnam